YMN or ymn may refer to:

 YMN, the IATA code for Makkovik Airport, Newfoundland and Labrador, Canada
 YMN, the station code for Yarraman railway station, Victoria, Australia
 ymn, the ISO 639-3 code for Yamna language, Indonesia